Of Unknown Origin is a 1983 Canadian psychological horror film directed by George P. Cosmatos. Based on the 1979 novel The Visitor by Chauncey Parker, it stars Peter Weller as a mild-mannered Manhattan banker, who becomes increasingly obsessive and destructive in his attempts to kill a rat loose in his renovated brownstone. The film's title refers to the misconception (repeated in the film) that rats have no known origin.

Plot 
Bart Hughes, a mild-mannered investment banker in New York City, moves with his wife Meg and their son Peter into a brownstone he helped to renovate. Meg's wealthy father invites the family to a vacation in Vermont, but Bart declines, preferring to work on a project that should get him a promotion. Shortly after his wife and child leave, Bart learns that the project has been assigned to another employee, James Hall. Bart is outraged, until his boss, Eliot Riverton, assigns him the important task of writing a reorganization plan for the company’s branch offices, due in two weeks. Eliot also invites Bart to join him at a dinner party for the bank's Los Angeles branch manager the following Thursday. 

That evening, Bart discovers a leak from the dishwasher that floods his kitchen floor. Clete, the superintendent of a neighboring apartment building, determines that the hole in the drainage hose was caused by a rat. He also informs Bart that rats can survive almost anything, including an atomic explosion, and warns that the females are twice as vicious as their male counterparts. Bart sets traps for the critter that evening, but when he examines them the next day, the bait has been removed and the traps are badly damaged. He spends his lunch break at the library researching rat behavior, and although he is horrified by the revelations, he shares them at the dinner party that evening, ruining the appetites of the other guests. 

Unable to find an exterminator on short notice, Bart seeks help from a hardware salesman, who recommends the use of poison. Meanwhile, the rat creeps through the house, leaving behind a path of destruction. Bart wakes in the middle of the night and is terrified by the sight of the rat inside the toilet bowl. He flushes the toilet, but the animal survives and makes its way back into the house. The next evening, Bart searches for his nemesis in the basement, and finds a litter of newborn rat pups. When Bart kills the pups, he narrowly escapes the mother rat’s retaliation. 

At the office, Eliot compliments Bart on the quality of his work, but asks if the tight deadline is giving him undo stress. Bart assures Eliot that his troubles are not work-related, and they will soon be under control. After work, Bart shares a taxicab with his secretary, Lorrie Wells, and invites her into his home. Lorrie expresses admiration for Bart’s handiwork, then asks if his recent troubles are related to his marriage. Bart responds by kissing Lorrie, but she is distracted by the sound of the scurrying rat and is anxious to leave. Afterward, Bart notices a stray cat outside the front door and takes it in, hoping it will eliminate the invader. Days later, when he discovers the cat slaughtered, Bart makes another unsuccessful attempt to hire an exterminator. He telephones Meg, begging for her return, but she has no desire to shorten her vacation. 

The next morning, Bart enters the basement, armed with a baseball bat, but quickly retreats, realizing he is no match for the creature. Bart is further daunted upon finding the report he has been preparing for the last week, chewed to pieces. Unshaven and disheveled, Bart approaches Eliot in the lobby of the office building, and declares that his first priority is to address his troubles at home. Eliot asks only that Bart not allow the other employees to see him in his current condition. 

Bart injures his hand while retrieving a rattrap, and drinks whiskey in the bathtub until he falls asleep. He dreams of a happy reunion with his family, interrupted by the rat attacking Meg, and Peter accidentally ingesting poison. As Bart regains consciousness, the creature descends from the ceiling, forcing him to take refuge on a hammock suspended above the bedroom floor. Meg attempts to reach him by telephone, as does Eliot, but neither is successful, as the rat has severed the line. Donning leg and arm pads, and reinforcing his baseball bat with nails and the jaws of broken rattraps, Bart enters the basement to face his nemesis. He swings wildly at the rat, rupturing pipes and flooding the basement. Bart continues his pursuit as the rat enters a scale model of the house, which he pummels with the bat until the creature is dead. He walks through his vandalized living room to the front door, as Meg and Peter return home. When Meg inquires about the damage to their home, Bart replies, “I had a party.”

Cast

Production
Principal photography began November 16, 1982 in Montreal, with a few days of location shooting in New York City. The majority of the film was shot on a 7,000 square foot set, recreating the interior of a Manhattan brownstone, created by production designer Anne Pritchard. The majority of the film was shot in-sequence, so that the set could be systematically “maimed” as the story progressed.

The film was the acting debut of both Shannon Tweed and Aimée Castle.

Critical reception 

Vincent Canby of The New York Times had nothing but disdain for the movie, but lightly praised Weller's performance and opens his review: 
Stephen King has called Of Unknown Origin one of his favorite horror films.

Awards and nominations 
Peter Weller won the Best Actor Award, at the 1983 Paris International Festival of Fantastic and Science-Fiction Film, for his performance.

Home video 
Warner Bros. released the film on VHS and DVD.

Scream Factory released the film on Blu-ray for the first time on May 22, 2018, featuring a new 2K scan from an interpositive element.

See also 
 List of films featuring home invasions

References

External links 
 
 
 
 

1983 horror films
1983 films
1980s psychological horror films
1980s English-language films
1980s Canadian films
Canadian natural horror films
Canadian psychological horror films
English-language Canadian films
Films about mice and rats
Films based on American novels
Films directed by George P. Cosmatos
Films set in New York City
Films shot in Montreal
Warner Bros. films